Nicolas Gilsoul (born 5 February 1982) is a Belgian rally co-driver. He is the former co-driver for Thierry Neuville and the current co-driver for Pierre-Louis Loubet.

Career

After competing in regional events from 2000, Gilsoul made his international debut in 2003 when co-driving with Bruno Thiry. He made his debut in the World Rally Championship in 2007.

Gilsoul started working with Thierry Neuville in 2011 and competed in the 2011 Intercontinental Rally Challenge.  In 2012, Gilsoul co-drove for Neuville in the World Rally Championship. The pair went on to drive for the Qatar World Rally Team in 2013 and they were a surprise runners-up in the championship after seven podiums from 13 events. Gilsoul and Neuville made the switch to the newly created rally team Hyundai Motorsport in 2014. He won his first rally in the WRC that year, winning the 2014 Rallye Deutschland, famously after rolling their World Rally Car at the pre-event shakedown.

Gilsoul continued co-driving for Neuville in Hyundai Motorsport and went on to win a further twelve events together. They were runners-up in the championship between 2016 and 2019.

In 2021, right before the season start in the 2021 Monte Carlo Rally, it was announced that Neuville and Gilsoul had stopped their co-operation. Gilsoul was eventually replaced by Martijn Wydaeghe as Neuville's co-driver.

Gilsoul made a return to the co-driving seat in April that year, now for French privateer Paul-Antoine Santoni at the Italian Rally championship round in Rallye Sanremo.

In 2023, Gilsoul returned to the World Rally Championship co-driving for Pierre-Louis Loubet for the M-Sport Ford World Rally Team.

WRC victories

Career results

WRC results

* Season still in progress.

References

External links

 WRC Profile

1982 births
Living people
Belgian rally co-drivers
Place of birth missing (living people)
World Rally Championship co-drivers